Marassana is a village which gave accommodation to the King Sri Vikrama Rajasinha of Kandy who ran away secretly due to an enemy attack  on Sri Lanka [formerly known as Ceylon]. It is located within the Central Province.

See also
List of towns in Central Province, Sri Lanka

External links

Populated places in Kandy District